Birnagar railway station is part of the Kolkata Suburban Railway system and operated by Eastern Railway. It is located at Birnagar on the Ranaghat–Krishnanagar line in Nadia district in the Indian state of West Bengal.

Layout

See also

References

External links 

 Biranagar Station Map

Sealdah railway division
Railway stations in Nadia district
Kolkata Suburban Railway stations